The Hero Cup is a golf tournament between teams of professional male golfers; one team representing Great Britain and Ireland, the other team representing Continental Europe. The tournament was first played in 2023, but the competition is reminiscent of the Seve Trophy which was held eight times between 2000 to 2013.

A sponsorship deal was reached with the Indian two-wheeler manufacturers Hero MotoCorp. Members of the winning team will each earn US$125,000, with those on the losing team each receiving US$75,000.

Schedule
The event is an "approved special event" on the European Tour. The prize money does not count towards the Race to Dubai (previously the Order of Merit).

The 2023 event was the first. After Luke Donald was appointed as Ryder Cup Captain, he was keen to reinstate a team match play contest to give playing and leadership experience to future Ryder Cup players, vice-captains and captains.

Format
The Hero Cup is a team event for professional male golfers; one team representing Great Britain and Ireland, the other team representing Continental Europe.

The cup is contested over three days (Friday to Sunday) and consists of one session of foursomes matches, two sessions of fourball matches and one session of singles matches, with all 20 players taking part in each session.

Team qualification and selection
Two playing captains were chosen by the European Tour.

Eligibility for the event is similar that of the European team in the Ryder Cup. Players have to be European and be a member of the European Tour.

In the inaugural tournament, all players were "captain's picks", players chosen at the discretion of Ryder Cup Captain Luke Donald in consultation with the team captains.

Results

Appearances
The following are those selected to play in at least one of the matches.

Great Britain and Ireland

  Tommy Fleetwood (2023)
  Ewen Ferguson (2023)
  Tyrrell Hatton (2023)
  Shane Lowry (2023)
  Robert MacIntyre (2023)
  Richard Mansell (2023)
  Séamus Power (2023)
  Callum Shinkwin (2023)
  Jordan Smith (2023)
  Matt Wallace (2023)

Continental Europe

  Francesco Molinari (2023)
  Thomas Detry (2023)
  Nicolai Højgaard (2023)
  Adrian Meronk (2023)
  Guido Migliozzi (2023)
  Alex Norén (2023)
  Victor Perez (2023)
  Thomas Pieters (2023)
  Antoine Rozner (2023)
  Sepp Straka (2023)

See also
 Seve Trophy

References

External links
Coverage on European Tour's official site

European Tour events
Team golf tournaments
Recurring sporting events established in 2023